Midnattsolscupen (Midnight Sun Cup) is a football tournament which is played annually in July in the Tornedalen (Norrbotten County) in northern Sweden.

Background
The Midnattsolscupen tournament is organised by the Polcirkeln/Svanstein FF, Ohtana/Aapua FF and Korpilombolo GIF clubs. Games are played in the villages of Svanstein and Aapua in Övertorneå, and in Ohtanajärvi in Pajala. Most of the matches are played during the late evening and as the name suggests - midnight, taking full advantage of the light nights in Tornedalen. The Final match is played in Svanstein and usually attracts large crowds.

The rules state that the competing clubs are mostly from northern Sweden, Finland and Norway. However Russian teams Spartak Moscow and Stolitsa Moskva have also taken part in the tournament.

In addition to men's team tournament, there is also a competition for boys teams.

Past winners

 1982 IFK Tärendö
 1983 Gällivare SK
 1984 Gällivare SK
 1985 Kiruna FF
 1986 Grovfjord IL
 1987 Notvikens IK
 1988 Rutviks SK
 1989 Rutviks SK
 1990 Rutviks SK Vandringspris 1
 1991 Assi IF
 1992 Haparanda FF
 1993 Haparanda FF
 1994 FC Santa Claus
 1995 Assi IF
 1996 Kiruna FF
 1997 Kiruna FF
 1998 IFK Kalix
 1999 Assi IF Vandringspris 2
 2000 Spartak Moscow
 2001 Malmbergets AIF
 2002 Kiruna FF
 2003 Polcirkeln/Svanstein FF
 2004 Spartak Moskva
 2005 Kiruna FF
 2006 Spartak Moscow Vandringspris 3
 2007 Spartak Moscow
 2008 Kiruna FF
 2009 Luleå SK
 2010 Stolitsa Moskva
 2011 Stolitsa Moskva

External links 
 Midnattsolscupen - BDFotboll.com
 Midnattsolscupen 2010 - OAFFpedia

Football cup competitions in Sweden